The Kid (also known as Disney's The Kid) is a 2000 American fantasy comedy-drama film, directed by Jon Turteltaub and written by Audrey Wells. The film follows a 40-year-old image consultant (Bruce Willis) who is mysteriously confronted by an eight-year-old version of himself (Spencer Breslin); Emily Mortimer, Lily Tomlin, Chi McBride, and Jean Smart also star.

The film was released in the United States by Walt Disney Pictures on July 7, 2000. It received mixed reviews from critics, with Rotten Tomatoes calling its message "annoyingly simplistic", and grossed $110 million against its $65 million budget.

Plot

Days from turning 40, Russ Duritz is a successful but abrasive image consultant in Los Angeles and has a strained relationship with his father. Returning home one day he finds a toy plane on his porch and a strange boy indoors, whom he chases through the streets.

After seeing the boy enter a diner, Russ finds no sign of him inside. Thinking he is hallucinating, he visits a psychiatrist, but finds the same boy on his couch eating popcorn and watching TV when he returns home. The boy says his name is Rusty and that he was just searching for his toy plane.

Seeing a resemblance, Russ compares memories and birthmarks and realizes Rusty is actually himself as a kid. After questioning Russ, Rusty tells him, "I grow up to be a loser." Rusty dreams of owning a dog naming Chester and flying planes, but Russ gave up on those dreams.

Russ's co-worker Amy thinks that Russ and Rusty are father and son and accuses him of being a dead-beat dad. Rusty assures her he is not his son and implores Russ to tell her the truth, but he thinks she'd never believe them. Amy realizes the truth while watching the two argue, as they are nearly identical.

In response to Rusty's questions about how he became Russ, he tells him about his scholarship to UCLA and working for six years to get a master's degree and change himself to who he is. Rusty understands Russ's job as an image consultant to be training people to pretend to be somebody else.

Russ cancels his appointments and spends the day with Rusty, trying to figure out what from the past needs to be fixed to get him back home. Driving through a tunnel, Russ recalls a fight he lost with some bullies who were abusing a three-legged dog. They emerge from the tunnel into Rusty's eighth birthday in 1968.

Russ helps Rusty win the fight and save the dog, but realizes that was only the first half of the ordeal. Rusty's terminally ill mother is called to take him home, where his father angrily berates him for getting into trouble and causing his mother further stress. Rusty breaks down and his father harshly tells him to grow up, making Russ realize why he is the way he is today.

Tearfully, Russ assures Rusty that he was not responsible for his mother's death, and that his father's outburst was not because he truly believed Rusty was responsible, but simply because he was scared about the prospect of raising his children alone.

They celebrate their birthday, but realize their efforts to change the outcome of the day have failed, as their father's outburst left Rusty emotionally scarred in both cases. When a dog named Chester greets Rusty, they find that his owner is an older version of them who owns planes and has a family with Amy.

Realizing that Rusty's appearance was meant to change his own ways rather than Rusty's, Russ arranges to see his father and, with a puppy, visits Amy, who invites him into her home.

Cast

 Bruce Willis as Russell Morley "Russ" Duritz
 Spencer Breslin as young Rusty Duritz
 Emily Mortimer as Amy
 Lily Tomlin as Janet
 Chi McBride as Kenny
 Juanita Moore as Kenny's Grandmother
 Jean Smart as Deidre Lefever
 Dana Ivey as Dr. Suzanne Alexander
 Reiley McClendon as Mark
 Steve Tom as Bruce, the Lawyer
 Larry King as himself
 Jeri Ryan as herself
 Nick Chinlund as himself
 Matthew Perry (uncredited) as Mr. Vivian
 Daniel von Bargen as Sam Duritz (Russ's father)
 Esther Scott as Clarissa
 Melissa McCarthy as Skyway Diner Waitress
 Elizabeth Arlen as Gloria Duritz (Russ's deceased mother)

Production
The Kid was part of a three-picture deal that Willis cut with the studio to compensate them for the dissolution of 1997's Broadway Brawler.

Reception

Box office
Disney's The Kid opened at #4 at the North American box office, making $12,687,726 USD in its opening weekend, behind The Patriot, The Perfect Storm, and Scary Movie. The film eventually ended its run by grossing $69,691,949 in North America and $40,625,631 elsewhere, thus bringing its worldwide total to $110,317,580, against a $65 million budget.

Critical response
Upon its release, the film received mixed reviews from critics. Review aggregator website Rotten Tomatoes calculated a 49% overall approval rating based on 99 reviews, with an average rating of 5.30/10. The consensus reads, "Critics find The Kid to be too sweet and the movie's message to be annoyingly simplistic."  On Metacritic, the film has a weighted average score of 45, based on 32 reviews, indicating "mixed or average reviews". Audiences polled by CinemaScore gave the film an average grade of "A−" on an A+ to F scale.

Film critic Roger Ebert of the Chicago Sun-Times gave the movie 3 stars out of 4, observing that "Disney's The Kid is warm-hearted and effective, a sweet little parable that involves a man and a boy who help each other become a better boy, and a better man. It's a sweet film, unexpectedly involving, and shows again that Willis, so easily identified with action movies, is gifted in the areas of comedy and pathos: This is a cornball plot, and he lends it credibility just by being in it." Film critic A. O. Scott writing for The New York Times observed: "Mr. Willis stands by while a child swipes a movie out of his open palm ... Spencer Breslin, Russ's tubby, cute-but-annoying almost-8-year-old self."

Accolades
The Kid was nominated for three awards, winning one.  For his role in the movie, at the 22nd Young Artist Awards presented by the Young Artist Association Spencer Breslin won the 2000 Young Artist Award for Best Performance in a Feature Film by a Young Actor Age Ten or Under.  He was also nominated for the 2001 Saturn Award for Best Performance by a Younger Actor awarded by Academy of Science Fiction, Fantasy and Horror Films, and the 2000 YoungStar Award for Best Young Actor in a Comedy Film, presented by The Hollywood Reporter.

References

External links
 
 
 
 

2000 films
2000s fantasy comedy-drama films
American fantasy comedy-drama films
2000s English-language films
Films directed by Jon Turteltaub
Films scored by Marc Shaiman
Films set in the 1960s
Films set in Los Angeles
Films shot in Los Angeles
Films with screenplays by Audrey Wells
Films about time travel
Walt Disney Pictures films
2000s American films